The de Havilland Mosquito is a British two-engine multi-role combat aircraft used by the Royal Air Force and other Allied air forces during World War II. Of the 7,781 aircraft built, 30 survive today, four of which are airworthy. Eight aircraft are currently under restoration.

Surviving aircraft

Surviving aircraft by manufacturer

Surviving aircraft

Wrecks

References 

de Havilland Mosquito
Survivors